The 1940 Nebraska gubernatorial election was held on November 5, 1940, and featured newspaper publisher and former state legislator Dwight Griswold, a Republican, defeating Democratic nominee, former U.S. Representative Terry Carpenter. Griswold became the first Republican to win the governorship since 1928.

Democratic primary

Candidates
Fred W. Bartzatt
Terry Carpenter, former U.S. Representative
John A. Guttery
Keith Neville, former Governor

Results

Republican primary

Candidates
C. E. Alter, state director of the National Reclamation Association
Ed M. Baumann, Mayor of West Point
Dwight Griswold, newspaper publisher and former member of the Nebraska Legislature
Arthur L. Miller, member of the Nebraska Legislature and physician
Robert G. Ross
Charles J. Warner, former Speaker of the Nebraska Legislature

Results

General election

Results

References

Gubernatorial
1940
Nebraska